Nafeesa Sultan, better known by her screen name Asha Sachdev is an Indian actress known for her roles as a supporting actress in Bollywood films of the 1970s and 1980s. She acted in a few early films as a lead actress as well, including the hit spy film Agent Vinod (1977) and the thriller film Woh Main Nahin. She won the Filmfare Award for Best Supporting Actress for Priyatama in 1978. She was the main lead in successful films like Hifazat (1973) and Ek Hi Raasta (1977). The song "Jis Kaam Ko Dono Aye Hai", picturised on her and Jeetendra from the film Ek Hi Raasta, sung by Kishore Kumar and Asha Bhosle and composed by Rajesh Roshan remains popular, along with the popular qawwali song "Pal Do Pal Ka " from The Burning Train sung by Mohammed Rafi and Asha Bhosle.

The daughter of actress Ranjana Sachdev and musician Ahmed Ali Khan (Ashiq Hussain) she adopted her stage name, after they divorced, from the name of her step-father. Singer Anwar Hussain is her brother and through her father's second marriage she is the half-sister of actor Arshad Warsi.

Career
Asha was an alumna of the Film and Television Institute of India, Pune and joined Bollywood. She began her career in a low-budget film Double Cross in 1972, wherein she played a bold and dynamic role, however the film was a flop. She got the main leading role in Hifazat (1973) and the film was appreciated for her good performance and the songs, especially "Yeh Mastaani Dagar" and "Hamrahi Mera Pyar", which became popular. Somehow the image stuck and thereafter she was offered only supporting and bold characters.  Her bare dare appearance in red hot pants in the Navin Nishchol-Rekha star thriller Woh Main Nahin (1974), which was remake of Naan Avan Illai, created a storm and she was flooded with item dance offers and vamp roles.

She occasionally received offers in the leading role - like in Agent Vinod and Ek Hi Raasta (1977), which became hits. She won the Filmfare Best Supporting Actress Award for her role as Neetu Singh's best friend in Priyatama in 1978. In the role, she wore a simple saree and was bespectacled throughout the film. Some of her notable films are Mama Bhanja, Lafange, Mehbooba, Satte Pe Satta, Duniya Meri Jeb Mein, The Burning Train, Judaai, Prem Rog and Eeshwar. In the late 80s, she moved to television, acting in serials throughout the 90s.

She made a comeback to films later in the 2000s and was seen playing character roles in films like Fiza, Aghaaz, Jhoom Barabar Jhoom and Aaja Nachle. In television, she worked in the early soap opera, Buniyaad (1986), and in 2008, she also appeared in TV series, Jugni Chali Jalandhar on SAB TV, with actor Ranjeet.

Filmography

Films

Television

References

External links 
 
 
 Asha Sachdev – Memories, 1998 interview

Indian film actresses
Living people
Actresses in Hindi cinema
Film and Television Institute of India alumni
Indian television actresses
21st-century Indian Muslims
Actresses from Mumbai
Filmfare Awards winners
1956 births